Branimir Grozdanov (born 21 May 1994) is a Bulgarian male volleyball player. He was part of the Bulgaria men's national volleyball team winning the silver medal at the 2015 European Games in Baku. He has played for Develi Belediyespor .

References

External links
 Branimir Grozdanov at the International Volleyball Federation
 
 

1994 births
Living people
Bulgarian men's volleyball players
Place of birth missing (living people)
Volleyball players at the 2015 European Games
European Games silver medalists for Bulgaria
European Games medalists in volleyball